Żurawianka is a river of Poland, a tributary of the Płonka in Płońsk.

Rivers of Poland
Rivers of Masovian Voivodeship